The Morton Pumpkin Festival is an annual four-day festival held in mid-September in Morton, Illinois in 1967. The event now draws more than 75,000 attendees annually. It is organized and sponsored by the Morton Chamber of Commerce.

In 1978, Governor James R. Thompson declared Morton the “Pumpkin Capital of the World.”

Morton's title of "Pumpkin Capital of the World" is tied to the presence of the Nestlé-owned Libby's pumpkin processing plant, which processes more than 80 percent of the world's canned pumpkin.

A virtual event was held in 2020 as many physical ones were scrapped because of the COVID-19 pandemic.

Festival Themes
Each year, the Morton Chamber of Commerce selects a special theme for the Morton Pumpkin Festival. Festival themes are voted on by the general public while taking the annual Pumpkin Festival Survey in September.  The top festival theme choices are then taken to the Pumpkin Festival Oversight Committee and the Morton Chamber of Commerce Board of Directors for the final selection. Themes are announced in January or February during the Morton Chamber of Commerce Annual Meet Up.

Many of the Pumpkin Festival events and activities including the parades, pageants, entertainment, competitions, and opening ceremony incorporate costumes, music, and other elements in celebration of the annual theme.

1973 Cinderella Land
1974 Nature's Harvest
1975 Seeds of Freedom
1976 Freedom's Harvest
1977 Centennial's Pumpkin
1978 Happiness is...
1979 It's a Pumpkin World
1980 Pumpkin Country Round Up
1981 Pumpkin Patch Patriotism
1982 Pumpkin Harvest Harmony
1983 Old Fashioned Pumpkin Picnic
1984 Pumpkin City Fantasy
1985 The Great Pumpkin Circus
1986 Pumpkin Festival Memories, 20 Years of Celebration
1987 Pumpkins Go Hollywood
1988 Pumpkins Go for the Gold
1989 Pumpkins Around the World
1990 We’re Off To See the Pumpkins
1991 Pumpkin Festival XXV
1992 Fairytales on Parade
1993 Pumpkin Paradise
1994 Pumpkin Fiesta
1995 Pumpkin Wonderland
1996 30th Annual Pumpkin Party
1997 Planet Pumpkin
1998 Pumpkins go Prehistoric
1999 Pumpkins Rockin’ & Rollin’
2000 Pumpkins on the Job
2001 A Pumpkin Odyssey
2002 Red, White & Blue in 2002
2003 Pumpkin Safari
2004 Pumpkins Under the Sea
2005 Great Pumpkins in History
2006 40th Pumpkin Birthday Party
2007 Pumpkins Go Hawaiian
2008 Superhero Pumpkins
2009 Christmas in the Pumpkin Patch
2010 Pumpkin Splash
2011 Pumpkins Across America
2012 Peace, Love, and Pumpkins
2013 Pumpkin Carnivale
2014 Pumpkins of the West
2015 Pumpkins of the Caribbean
2016 Golden Pumpkin: A Celebration of 50 Years
2017 Das Pumpkin 
2018 S'more Pumpkin
2019 Luck O' the Pumpkin
2020 Roaring Pumpkins & All That Jazz

Food
Many attendees of the festival come just for the food, especially the pumpkin flavored food.  Beyond the usual fair/carnival favorites and pumpkin pie, some of the other items include pumpkin chili, pumpkin cookies, pumpkin doughnuts, and pumpkin ice cream.

The marquee food-related event typically happens on the Saturday morning of the Pumpkin Festival. Saturday morning showcases the all-you-can-eat Pumpkin Pancake breakfast.

Punkin Chuckin'
The Punkin Chuckin' Contest was a Morton tradition that involved giant contraptions that hurled, catapulted, or shot 5-10 pound pumpkins in the air into an open field. The competition's last year was 2016. Competitors competed for the title of “Punkin' Chucker Supreme” with a one-mile goal. The contest was modeled after the contest in Sussex County, Delaware (which plans to move to Rantoul, Illinois in November 2019) the first weekend after Halloween, but Morton holds the world record for farthest pumpkin thrown.

The Punkin Chuckin’ Contest turned out various machines, from trebuchets to air cannons, with one machine holding a spot in the Guinness Book of World Records. A pumpkin leaving the tube flies at nearly  but loses velocity quickly. This cannon has been seen on the Late Show with David Letterman as well as another famous device, the Acme Catapult, which saw airtime on The Tonight Show with Jay Leno in 2003.

Performances
Performances in 2019 included: Morton High School (Morton, Illinois), Central Illinois Banjo Club, New Odyssey Guy, Bogside Zukes, Cousin Eddie, Jim Markum Swing Band, and American English.

References

Agriculture in Illinois
Festivals in Illinois
Harvest festivals
Tourist attractions in Tazewell County, Illinois